Stacie Passon (born October 1, 1969) is an American film director, screenwriter, and producer whose debut film Concussion premiered at the 2013 Sundance Film Festival and subsequently won a Teddy Award Jury Prize at the 2013 Berlin International Film Festival.

Personal life
Passon was born in Detroit, Michigan. She is Jewish. She attended Columbia College Chicago, from which she graduated in 1993.

Career
Passon began her career as a commercial director and producer. Her 2013 film Concussion garnered Passon nominations for the Gotham Independent Film Award for Breakthrough Director and the Independent Spirit Award for Best First Feature, and the film won a GLAAD Media Award for Outstanding Film – Limited Release. Passon has directed episodes of the Primetime Emmy Award-winning comedy series Transparent.. In 2016, she executive produced the comedy film Women Who Kill. She directed the film adaptation of the Shirley Jackson novel We Have Always Lived in the Castle (2018) and executive produced and directed the six-part Sky drama Little Birds (2019). In 2021 it was announced that Passon would executive produce and direct The Serpent Queen for Lionsgate.

Filmography

See also
 Dramatic license
 LGBT culture in New York City
 List of female film and television directors
 List of lesbian filmmakers
 List of LGBT-related films directed by women
 List of LGBT people from New York City

References

External links
 

1969 births
Living people
American television directors
American women film directors
American women film producers
American women screenwriters
Jewish American screenwriters
American lesbian artists
American lesbian writers
LGBT television directors
LGBT producers
American LGBT screenwriters
Film directors from New Jersey
Film producers from New Jersey
Screenwriters from New Jersey
People from Montclair, New Jersey
Film directors from Michigan
Film producers from Michigan
Screenwriters from Michigan
LGBT people from Michigan
People from Detroit
Columbia College Chicago alumni
American women television directors
21st-century American Jews
21st-century American women writers
LGBT Jews